The Timaru Courier, also known as The Timaru Courier, is an A3 tabloid community newspaper delivered free to 27,000 homes every Thursday in the Timaru and South Canterbury area of New Zealand's South Island. It is published by Allied Press.

Notes and references

External links 
Timaru Courier Official website
Allied Press newspaper Timaru Courier
Timaru Courier's property magazine Property Times
Timaru Courier's Motoring website

Allied Press
Newspapers published in New Zealand
Mass media in Timaru
Publications with year of establishment missing